Turkey has had many earthquakes. This list includes any notable historical earthquakes that have epicenters within the current boundaries of Turkey, or which caused significant effects in this area. Overall, the population in major cities like Istanbul resides in structures that are a mix of vulnerable and earthquake resistant construction.

Tectonic setting
Turkey is a seismically active area within the complex zone of collision between the Eurasian Plate and both the African and Arabian Plates. Much of the country lies on the Anatolian Plate, a small plate bounded by two major strike-slip fault zones, the North Anatolian Fault and East Anatolian Fault. The western part of the country is also affected by the zone of extensional tectonics in the Aegean Sea caused by the southward migration of the Hellenic arc. The easternmost part of Turkey lies on the western end of the Zagros fold and thrust belt, which is dominated by thrust tectonics.

Seismic hazard
Seismic hazard in Turkey is highest along the plate boundaries, but there is a significant risk of damaging earthquakes almost anywhere in the country. Seismic maps that show risk have changed through time.

Buildings

List of notable earthquakes

Historical earthquakes in Turkey (before 1900)

1900–1999

2000–present

See also
 Geology of Turkey
 List of earthquakes in the Levant

References

Further reading

External links
1:25,000 scale fault maps (click the square to see a map if there are faults)
Seismic Risk Map (requires logon with Turkish ID)

 
Turkey
Earthquakes